William Topaz McGonagall (March 1825 – 29 September 1902) was a Scottish poet of Irish descent. He gained notoriety as an extremely bad poet who exhibited no recognition of, or concern for, his peers' opinions of his work.

He wrote about 200 poems, including "The Tay Bridge Disaster" and "The Famous Tay Whale", which are widely regarded as some of the worst in English literature. Groups throughout Scotland engaged him to make recitations from his work, and contemporary descriptions of these performances indicate that many listeners were appreciating McGonagall's skill as a comic music hall character. Collections of his verse remain popular, with several volumes available today.

McGonagall has been lampooned as the worst poet in British history. The chief criticisms are that he was deaf to poetic metaphor and unable to scan correctly. His only apparent understanding of poetry was his belief that it needed to rhyme. McGonagall's fame stems from the humorous effects these shortcomings are considered to generate in his work. Scholars argue that his inappropriate rhythms, weak vocabulary, and ill-advised imagery combine to make his work amongst the most unintentionally amusing dramatic poetry in the English language. His work is in a long tradition of narrative ballads and verse written and published about great events and tragedies, and widely circulated among the local population as handbills. In an age before radio and television, their voice was one way of communicating important news to an avid public.

Origins and early life
William McGonagall's parents, Charles and Margaret, were Irish. His Irish surname is a variation on Mag Congail, a popular name in County Donegal. Throughout his adult life he claimed to have been born in Edinburgh, giving his year of birth variously as 1825 or 1830, but his entry in the 1841 Census gives his place of birth, like his parents', as "Ireland". Biographer Norman Watson suggests that McGonagall may have falsified his place of birth, as a native-born Scotsman would be better treated under the Poor Law of 1845 than one born in Ireland. By looking at census, marriage and death records, David Phillips identifies 1825 as the more likely birth date.

The McGonagall family moved several times in search of work, possibly spending time in Glasgow and on South Ronaldsay before settling in Dundee around 1840. Here, William was apprenticed to follow his father's trade as a handloom weaver, putting an end to whatever formal education he may have had. Having learned his trade, McGonagall proceeded to educate himself, taking "great delight in reading books", particularly cheap editions of Shakespeare's plays.

On 11 July 1846, he married Jean King, a fellow mill worker from Stirling. Together they had five sons and two daughters. Despite the Industrial Revolution slowly making weavers obsolete, McGonagall appeared to prosper, as there was still need for skilled workers to perform tasks of great complexity.

Whilst working at the loom, McGonagall would entertain his shopmates with recitations from Shakespeare. On one occasion they paid a local theatre owner to allow him to appear in the title role in a production of Macbeth. Convinced that the actor playing Macduff was envious of him, McGonagall refused to die in the final act. For this performance, the Book of Heroic Failures awarded him the title of the "worst Macbeth" as well as "worst British poet".

Career

The turning point in McGonagall's life came in June 1877. Work as a weaver had become more difficult to find, as his eldest daughter had shamed the family by giving birth to an illegitimate child; at this point, he was seized with a new inspiration:

He wrote his first poem, "An Address to the Rev. George Gilfillan", displaying the hallmarks that would characterise his work. Gilfillan, himself an untrained and poorly reviewed polemic Presbyterian preacher who occasionally dabbled in poetry, commented admiringly "Shakespeare never wrote anything like this."

McGonagall realised if he were to succeed as a poet, he required a patron and wrote to Queen Victoria. He received a letter of rejection, written by a royal functionary, thanking him for his interest. McGonagall took this as praise for his work. During a trip to Dunfermline in 1879, he was mocked by the Chief Templar at the International Organisation of Good Templars, of which McGonagall was a member, who told him his poetry was very bad. McGonagall told the man that "it was so very bad that Her Majesty had thanked McGonagall for what the Chief Templar had condemned."

The letter gave McGonagall confidence in his "poetic abilities", and he felt his reputation could be enhanced further if he were to give a live performance before the Queen. When he arrived, he announced himself as "The Queen's Poet". The guards informed him "You're not the Queen's poet! Tennyson is the Queen's poet!" (Alfred, Lord Tennyson was the poet laureate). McGonagall presented the letter but was refused entry and had to return home. Undeterred, he continued writing poetry, and he reported events to the newspapers, earning some minor recognition.

Throughout his life McGonagall campaigned against excessive drinking, appearing in pubs and bars to give edifying poems and speeches, which proved popular. He met with the ire of the publicans, on one occasion being pelted with peas for reciting a poem about the evils of "strong drink".

In 1883 he celebrated the official opening of University College, Dundee with the poem "The Inauguration of University College Dundee" which opens with the stanza:

McGonagall constantly struggled with money and earned money by selling his poems in the streets, or reciting them in halls, theatres and public houses. When he was in periods of financial insecurity, his friends supported him with donations. In 1880, he sailed to London to seek his fortune, and in 1887 to New York. In both instances, he returned unsuccessful.

He found lucrative work performing his poetry at a local circus. He read his poems while the crowd was permitted to pelt him with eggs, flour, herrings, potatoes and stale bread. For this, he received fifteen shillings a night. McGonagall seemed happy with this arrangement, but the events became so raucous that the city magistrates were forced to put a ban on them. McGonagall was outraged and wrote a poem in response entitled "Lines in Protest to the Dundee Magistrates":

Throughout his life McGonagall seemed oblivious to the general opinion of his poems, even when his audience were pelting him with eggs and vegetables. Author Norman Watson speculates in his biography of McGonagall that he may have been on the "autism-Asperger's spectrum". Christopher Hart, writing in The Sunday Times, says that this seems "likely".

In 1890, McGonagall was in dire straits financially. To help him, his friends funded the publication of a collection of his work, Poetic Gems. The proceeds provided McGonagall with enough money to live on for a time. By 1893, he was annoyed by his mistreatment in the streets and wrote an angry poem threatening to leave Dundee. One newspaper quipped that he would probably stay for another year once he realised "that Dundee rhymes with 1893". Though trying his hand at writing prose and endorsements for local businesses for a short time, in 1894, he and his wife were forced to move to Perth.

Soon after, he received a letter purporting to be from representatives of King Thibaw Min of Burma. In it, he was informed that the King had knighted him as Topaz McGonagall, Grand Knight of the Holy Order of the White Elephant Burmah. Despite the fact that this was a fairly transparent hoax, McGonagall would refer to himself as "Sir William Topaz McGonagall, Knight of the White Elephant, Burmah" in his advertising for the rest of his life.

In 1895, McGonagall and his wife moved to Edinburgh. Here, McGonagall met with some success, becoming a "cult figure" and was in great demand. It did not last long, and by 1900 he was once again destitute and now old and sickly. Though he was now too frail to walk the streets selling his poems, donations from friends, as ever, kept him afloat.

He died penniless in 1902, above what is now The Captain's Bar in Edinburgh's South College Street and was buried in an unmarked grave in Greyfriars Kirkyard in Edinburgh. A wall-mounted memorial installed to his memory in 1999 is inscribed:

Additionally, a plaque above 5 South College Street in Edinburgh shows an image of McGonagall, and bears the inscription:

Tay Bridge Disaster

"The Tay Bridge Disaster" has been widely reproduced, and recounts the events of the evening of 28 December 1879, when, during a severe gale, the Tay Rail Bridge near Dundee collapsed as a train was passing over it. It begins:

(Modern sources give the death toll as 75.)

And finishes:

More than a year before the disaster, McGonagall had written a poem in praise of the Tay Bridge: "The Railway Bridge of the Silvery Tay", in which he specifically expressed a desire

Once the replacement bridge had been built, he composed an ode to the new construction: "An Address to the New Tay Bridge" "Strong enough all windy storms to defy".

In popular culture

In comedy and theatre
 The memory of McGonagall was resurrected by comedian Spike Milligan. A character called McGoonagall frequently appears in The Goon Show, alternately played by Milligan and Peter Sellers. Milligan also occasionally gave readings of McGonagall's verse. McGoonagall often introduces himself as "William McGoonagall, Poet, Tragedian and Twit".
 An episode of Monty Python's Flying Circus featured a McGonagall-esque poet called Ewan McTeagle, whose poems were actually prose requests for money.
 In 2018 and early 2019, a musical comedy play titled McGonagall's Chronicles (Which Will Be Remembered for a Very Long Time) was toured in Scotland, retelling the story of the poet in "almost rhyme". It was directed by Joe Douglas and written by Gary McNair; McNair appeared in the lead role, with live musical support from Brian James O'Sullivan and from Simon Liddell, who composed the show's songs.
 In comedy it was once remarked "If his poetry was any better he would be anonymous".

In literature and publications
 A collection of 35 broadsheet poems of McGonagall, the majority signed by him, was bought for £6,600 (including commission) from Lyon & Turnbull, Edinburgh auctioneers, on 16 May 2008.
 Satirical magazine Private Eye has printed a number of McGonagallesque poems concerning great events of the day, usually under the byline William Rees-McGonagall, a portmanteau of McGonagall's name and that of William Rees-Mogg. For example, in 2007, they covered the success of the Scottish National Party in the Scottish Parliament election.
 McGonagall was the subject of the newspaper column Ripley's Believe It or Not! on 11 October 2007, saying he "was often considered the world's worst poet, even by his own publisher, yet his writings are still in print a century after his death!".
Milligan further recounted McGonagall's life story in the pastiche novel William McGonagall – the Truth at Last, co-written with Jack Hobbs.
 In The Wee Free Men by Terry Pratchett, the Nac Mac Feegle have a battle poet, or Gonnagle, who repels the enemy through the awfulness of his poetry. Training up a successor, 'the old bard congratulates the young one: "That, lad," he said proudly, "was some of the worst poetry I have heard for a long time. It was offensive to the ear and a torrrture to the soul...a verrry commendable effort! We'll make a gonnagle out o' ye yet!"... 'The Folklore of Discworld' notes that this is 'a touching tribute to the memory of William McGonagall...famously excruciating Scottish poet'.
 In the Harry Potter books, author J. K. Rowling chose the surname of the Professor of Transfiguration, Minerva McGonagall, because she had heard of McGonagall and loved the surname.
 The life of the bard, and Corstorphine Round Table's particular affection for the poet, is celebrated in a comic graphic novel by one of its former members, Charles Nasmyth.
 The Scots-language  translation of Asterix names the village bard "Magonaglix" in reference to McGonagall.

In live performances
 Billy Connolly visited Dundee and the Tay Bridge during his 1994 World Tour of Scotland, where he talked about McGonagall and recited a passage from his book Poetic Gems.

In motion pictures
 A 1974 movie called The Great McGonagall starred Spike Milligan as a fictionalised William McGonagall. Peter Sellers played Queen Victoria.
 In episode 13 of season 2 of the Canadian TV series Murdoch Mysteries, a murder victim is holding a copy of a book entitled "The Collected Works of William Topaz McGonagall". While the death appears accidental, the detective suspects foul play because "it is highly unlikely that anyone would voluntarily reach for a volume of McGonagall."
 In 2016, The Atlantic premiered a short documentary about the life of McGonagall entitled "worst.poet.ever."

In music
 McGonagall's poem "The Famous Tay Whale" was set to music by Matyas Seiber for the second Hoffnung Music Festival in 1958. The arrangement calls for a narrator (at the premiere the narrator was Edith Evans), full orchestra, a fog horn, and an espresso machine.
 The opening stanza of "The Epic Rage of Furious Thunder" on Gloryhammer's album Tales from the Kingdom of Fife contains several references to McGonagall's poem "The Tay Bridge Disaster". The closing epilogue of the song also ends with a direct quote of the final two lines of the poem.
 In 2022, the norwegian duo EL/NeUe released a song on streaming services called "William McGonagall" - a sad song from McGonagall's point of view.

In radio
 Dundonian actor Brian Cox compared the comic character Bob Servant to McGonagall while playing Servant in a radio adaptation. Servant is the creation of Dundonian author Neil Forsyth, who has acknowledged McGonagall as an influence in the Bob Servant character.
 Cox went on to play the part of William McGonagall in the radio play Topaz, a fictional depiction of his trip to Balmoral which was broadcast on BBC Radio 4 on 26 October 2013.

Honours and memorials 

McGonagall's home city of Dundee maintains several reminders of his life:

 The William Topaz McGonagall Appreciation Society held a McGonagall Supper on board the frigate Unicorn on 12 June 1997, during which the courses were allegedly served in reverse order, starting with the coffee and ending with the starters. A short play was performed by local actors.
 Beginning in 2004, the Dundee Science Centre Education Outreach has hosted an annual Charity McGonagall Gala Dinner, in which guests eat their meal backwards from dessert to starter and hear the welcome address as they depart, "combining traditional and unconventional entertainment, with four-course dinner, complimentary wine and whisky".
 There is a McGonagall Square in the West End of Dundee.
 A number of inscriptions of his poetry have been made, most notably along the side of the River Tay on the pavement of Riverside Drive in Dundee. This monument contains a deliberate spelling mistake reading, "Beatiful railway bridge of the silv'ry Tay".
 Dundee Central Library maintains a William McGonagall Collection of his works.

He is buried in an unmarked grave in Greyfriars Kirkyard, Edinburgh. From c.1950 to 1995 a memorial bench stood on the path immediately to the north side of the church commemorating McGonagall and bearing the typically McGonagall-esque inscription "Feeling tired and need a seat? Sit down here, and rest your feet". The bench fell into disrepair and was not replaced. It is not known what became of its small plaque.

Poems 

McGonagall's poems were published by his friends, in a series of books bearing variations on the title Poetic Gems. In the modern era, the entire series is reprinted in a single collection called The Complete McGonagall. When a poem was written has no bearing on which of the Poetic Gems books it appears in: the "Address to the Rev. George Gilfillan" and "Requisition to the Queen" were amongst McGonagall's earliest written poems, yet they appear in More Poetic Gems and Last Poetic Gems respectively.

See also

 Romeo Coates
 Florence Foster Jenkins
 James McIntyre (poet)
 Amanda McKittrick Ros
 Julia A. Moore
 Wesley Willis
 Tommy Wiseau
 Scottish literature
 The Eye of Argon
 Poetaster

References

External links 

 McGonagall Online 
 William McGonagall in the Poetry Foundation
 Documentary film about McGonagall
 Bard of the Silv'ry Tay A profile by James Campbell
 Picture of his memorial
 
 

1825 births
1902 deaths
19th-century Scottish male actors
19th-century Scottish poets
British weavers
Burials at Greyfriars Kirkyard
Date of birth unknown
People associated with Dundee
Poets associated with Dundee
Scottish male stage actors
Scottish people of Irish descent
Victorian poets
Writers from Edinburgh
International Organisation of Good Templars